Holly Grove Presbyterian Church is a historic church at 244 East 2nd Street in Holly Grove, Arkansas.  It is a single-story wood-frame building, with a gable-roofed rectangular sanctuary, a square tower off to one side, and a Sunday School addition to the rear.  The exterior, originally clad in board-and-batten siding, is now finished in metal siding that closely resembles a c. 1900 residing.   It exhibits a combination of Greek Revival and Gothic Revival features.  It was built in 1881 for a congregation established in 1839, and was its second sanctuary, replacing one destroyed by fire in 1871.

The building was listed on the National Register of Historic Places in 1991.

See also
National Register of Historic Places listings in Monroe County, Arkansas

References

Presbyterian churches in Arkansas
Churches on the National Register of Historic Places in Arkansas
Greek Revival church buildings in Arkansas
Gothic Revival church buildings in Arkansas
Churches in Monroe County, Arkansas
National Register of Historic Places in Monroe County, Arkansas